Alkabo is an unincorporated community in Divide County, North Dakota, United States. The Alkabo School, which is listed on the National Register of Historic Places, is located in Alkabo.

The name is a portmanteau of alkali and gumbo, two types of soil found in the area.

See also
 List of geographic names derived from portmanteaus

References

External links

Unincorporated communities in Divide County, North Dakota
Unincorporated communities in North Dakota